Sandy (San-Dŷ meaning saint house) is an area in the county of Carmarthenshire in south-west Wales, on the western border of Llanelli town, about 5 miles east of Burry Port.

The area is home to Sandy Water Park, a large project which has seen acres of disused industrial land converted to parkland and a lake. It now forms a part of the more recent Millennium Coastal Park.

Sandy is adjacent to Stradey, which once contained the famous Stradey Park stadium, former home to Llanelli RFC and the Llanelli Scarlets. In 2008/09 the Scarlets moved to a new purpose-built stadium in Pemberton and Stradey Park has now been demolished.

External links 

Llanelli Rural
Villages in Carmarthenshire